Nicholas Bernard Santino (born July 28, 1988) is an American musician, singer-songwriter. He is best known as the former frontman of pop rock band A Rocket to the Moon. After the band broke up in 2013, he went on to pursue a solo career and has released numerous solo EPs and a full-length album, Big Skies, which was released on May 27, 2014. In 2015, he formed a pop rock band Beach Weather.

Early life
Nick Santino was born on July 28, 1988 in the family of Bernie and Donna Santino in Braintree, Massachusetts.

While in high school Santino was in two bands called the Bad Year and the Midway Class as the lead singer.

Music career

A Rocket to the Moon (2006–2013)

Santino started A Rocket to the Moon in the summer of 2006 as a musical experiment. In early 2008 he assembled a band of musicians with the help of the Maine. Same year the band gained notoriety and was signed to Fueled By Ramen. A Rocket to the Moon released a number of EPs and two full-length albums, On Your Side (2009) and Wild & Free (2013), before breaking up in 2013.

Solo career (2013–2015, 2019, 2020–present)
After ARTTM broke up, Santino went on to pursue an alternative rock/country solo career under the name "Nick Santino and the Northern Wind". The first 4-track EP he released under this name was Going Home, released through iTunes on July 30, 2013. The second EP, The Ones You Meet Along the Way: A Collection of Stories from the Road, was released on October 22, 2013. On November 2, 2013, Santino put out a new song "Wildfire on the Run" on YouTube. On December 20, 2013, Santino and Caitlin Harnett released their version of the Christmas song "Have Yourself a Merry Little Christmas". Santino participated in the "Up Close & Personal" tour with This Century in late 2013.

In 2014 Santino decided to go under his own name. On May 23, 2014, a live EP of Nick Santino and the Maine Live in Sao Paulo was released as a free download. On May 27, 2014, a debut solo full-length album titled Big Skies was released. The album peaked at #3 on the iTunes singer/songwriter charts. Santino played the 8123 tour with the Maine in Brazil and played on Vans Warped Tour 2014. In October 2014 he played the UK leg of 8123 tour with the Maine. On December 19, 2014 Santino released a Savannah EP.

On August 10, 2019, Santino performed at Emo Carnival led by the Maine in São Paulo, Brazil. On November 1 to 5, 2019, Nick Santino played the Maine's The Mirror tour as a special guest. In November 2019, Santino played as a support guest for Mayday Parade in New York.

On April 24, 2020, Santino released a single "Peace & Love", with the EP of the same name on May 29, 2020.

Beach Weather (2015–2017, 2022–present)

In August 2015, Nick Santino formed Beach Weather with Reeve Powers (bass), Ian Holubiak (lead guitar) and Austin Scates (drums) after being invited by the Maine to open for their Free For All 2015 Tour. Their debut EP What a Drag was written by Santino and Sean Silverman (of The Technicolors) and released on August 28, 2015, via 8123.

Discography

A Rocket to the Moon
 Summer 2007 EP (2007)
 Greetings From... EP (2008)
 On Your Side (2009)
 The Rainy Day Sessions EP (2010)
 That Old Feeling EP (2012)
 Wild & Free (2013)

Solo musician
 Going Home EP (2013) (as Nick Santino & The Northern Wind)
 The Ones You Meet Along the Way: A Collection of Stories from the Road EP (2013) (as Nick Santino & The Northern Wind)
 Live in Sao Paulo EP (2014) (with The Maine)
 Big Skies (2014)
 Savannah EP (2014)
 Peace & Love EP (2020)
 Seasonal Sadness Single (2020)
 Anxiety Single (2021)
 Uncle Carter Single (2021)

Beach Weather
 What a Drag EP (2015)
 Chit Chat EP (2016)
 Basement Sessions EP (2017)
 Pineapple Sunrise (2023)

References

1988 births
Living people
American alternative rock musicians
American pop rock musicians
American indie rock musicians
American male singer-songwriters
People from Braintree, Massachusetts
21st-century American singers
21st-century American guitarists
Guitarists from Massachusetts
American male pianists
American male guitarists
21st-century American pianists
21st-century American male singers
Singer-songwriters from Massachusetts